Gummanur Jayaram (born 16 October 1968) is an Indian politician from YSR Party and current Minister of Labour, Employment, Training, Factories in the Government of Andhra Pradesh. He was elected as a Member of the AP Legislative Assembly (India) (MLA) representing Alur (Assembly constituency) in both the 2014 Andhra Pradesh Legislative Assembly election and 2019 Andhra Pradesh Legislative Assembly elections.

Political career

2019 election 
In 2019 election, Jayaram contested again as MLA representing YSRCP from Alur against Kotla Sujathamma from TDP. He won with total votes of 107,101 with 161 Postal and 106940 General representing 56%. With a statewide majority by the YSRCP, they formed the state government headed by Jagan Mohan Reddy as CM, and Jayaram was chosen as Minister of Labour, Employment, Training, Factories in Jagan's cabinet.

Development projects

Jayaram led a project to bringing water channels to his constituency. He also addressed the problem in labour department, and worked with the Central Government to deliver the upcoming hospital where MoS Santosh Kumar Gangwar laid the foundation stone of the ESI Hospital in Kakinada, Andhra Pradesh.

References

Living people
Telugu politicians
People from Rayalaseema
1968 births
Andhra Pradesh MLAs 2014–2019
Andhra Pradesh MLAs 2019–2024
YSR Congress Party politicians